Amigos - Van Pelt Sint Antonius Zoersel is a Belgian volleyball club based in Zoersel.

The team was founded in 1997, as a result of a merger between VOC Halle (founded 1974) and VC Amigos (founded 1972). Zoersel's women's A squad won promotion to the highest level of Belgian volleyball for the first time in 2006. The men's A squad currently participates in the EuroMillions Volley League since the season 2015-2016.

Amigos Zoersel is the club with most members in Belgium. It counts 8 women's and 9 men's senior teams, and many youth teams.

Former squad (2018-2019)

Women 2018-2019 
Trainer & coach:  Jeroen Rymen
Scouting:  Maarten Adriaensen
Assistant-coach:  Tania Celis
Strength trainer:  Christine Deleuil
Physiotherapist:  Gilles Biset
Mental performance coach:  Michel Sneyers
Mentor:  Rene Rogge

Men 2018-2019
Trainer & coach:  Eric Van Drom
Scouting:  Elien van der Burgt
Physiotherapist:  Gilles Biset
Team Manager:  Rudi Brison

External links
Official site 

Belgian volleyball clubs
Sport in Antwerp Province
Zoersel